Persia Woolley (November 8, 1935 – October 3, 2017) was an American author, perhaps best known for her Guinevere trilogy. She also has written a number of works on writing, such as How to Write and Sell Historical Fiction (2000).

Works
In the historical fiction genre, Woolley wrote the Guinevere trilogy, about King Arthur's wife, Guinevere. This trilogy comprises Child of the Northern Spring (1987), Queen of the Summer Stars (1990) and Guinevere: The Legend in Autumn (1993).

Her non-fiction work includes two books on divorce, Creative Survival for Single Mothers (1974) and The Custody Handbook (1979).

Personal life
Woolley grew up in Auburn, California as the only child of Lois and William Higman. She studied architecture at University of California, Berkeley, and married James P. Woolley, an engineer in 1956. They had two children before divorcing in 1958; Woolley's experience as a single mother led her to write her first two books,  Creative Survival for Single Mothers (1974) and The Custody Handbook (1979). She married Dr. Edwjard Garwin in 1978.

Persia Woolley died October 3, 2017, in Sebastopol, CA, USA, at the age of eighty one.

References

External links
 
 
 

20th-century American novelists
American self-help writers
American historical novelists
American women novelists
Writers of modern Arthurian fiction
University of California, Berkeley people
1935 births
2017 deaths
People from Auburn, California